Sergei Bubka and Adrián Menéndez were the defending champions but Bubka decided not to participate.
Menéndez played alongside Steve Darcis.
Hsieh Cheng-peng and Lee Hsin-han defeated Colin Ebelthite and John Peers 7–5, 7–5 in the final to win the title.

Seeds

Draw

Draw

External Links
 Main Draw

UniCredit Czech Open - Doubles
2012 Doubles